The 2002 Australian motorcycle Grand Prix was the penultimate round of the 2002 MotoGP Championship. It took place on the weekend of 18–20 October 2002 at the Phillip Island Grand Prix Circuit.

MotoGP classification

250 cc classification

125 cc classification

Championship standings after the race (MotoGP)

Below are the standings for the top five riders and constructors after round fifteen has concluded.

Riders' Championship standings

Constructors' Championship standings

 Note: Only the top five positions are included for both sets of standings.

References

Australian motorcycle Grand Prix
Australian
Motorcycle
Motorsport at Phillip Island
October 2002 sports events in Australia